In cell biology a centriole is a cylindrical organelle composed mainly of a protein called tubulin. Centrioles are found in most eukaryotic cells, but are not present in conifers (Pinophyta), flowering plants (angiosperms) and most fungi, and are only present in the male gametes of charophytes, bryophytes, seedless vascular plants, cycads, and Ginkgo. A bound pair of centrioles, surrounded by a highly ordered mass of dense material, called the pericentriolar material (PCM), makes up a structure called a centrosome.

Centrioles are typically made up of nine sets of short microtubule triplets, arranged in a cylinder. Deviations from this structure include crabs and Drosophila melanogaster embryos, with nine doublets, and Caenorhabditis elegans sperm cells and early embryos, with nine singlets. Additional proteins include centrin, cenexin and tektin.

The main function of centrioles is to produce cilia during interphase and the aster and the spindle during cell division.

History
The centrosome was discovered jointly by Walther Flemming in 1875  and Edouard Van Beneden in 1876.Edouard Van Beneden made the first observation of centrosomes as composed of two orthogonal centrioles in 1883. Theodor Boveri introduced the term "centrosome" in 1888 and the term "centriole" in 1895. The basal body was named by Theodor Wilhelm Engelmann in 1880. The pattern of centriole duplication was first worked out independently by Étienne de Harven and Joseph G. Gall c. 1950.

Role in cell division

Centrioles are involved in the organization of the mitotic spindle and in the completion of cytokinesis. Centrioles were previously thought to be required for the formation of a mitotic spindle in animal cells. However, more recent experiments have demonstrated that cells whose centrioles have been removed via laser ablation can still progress through the G1 stage of interphase before centrioles can be synthesized later in a de novo fashion. Additionally, mutant flies lacking centrioles develop normally, although the adult flies' cells lack flagella and cilia and as a result, they die shortly after birth.
The centrioles can self replicate during cell division.

Cellular organization
Centrioles are a very important part of centrosomes, which are involved in organizing microtubules in the cytoplasm. The position of the centriole determines the position of the nucleus and plays a crucial role in the spatial arrangement of the cell.

Fertility
Sperm centrioles are important for 2 functions: (1) to form the sperm flagellum and sperm movement and (2) for the development of the embryo after fertilization. The sperm supplies the centriole that creates the centrosome and microtubule system of the zygote.

Ciliogenesis
In flagellates and ciliates, the position of the flagellum or cilium  is determined by the mother centriole, which becomes the basal body. An inability of cells to use centrioles to make functional flagella and cilia has been linked to a number of genetic and developmental diseases. In particular, the inability of centrioles to properly migrate prior to ciliary assembly has recently been linked to Meckel–Gruber syndrome.

Animal development

Proper orientation of cilia via centriole positioning toward the posterior of embryonic node cells is critical for establishing left-right asymmetry, during mammalian development.

Centriole duplication
Before DNA replication, cells contain two centrioles, an older mother centriole, and a younger daughter centriole. During cell division, a new centriole grows at the proximal end of both mother and daughter centrioles. After duplication, the two centriole pairs (the freshly assembled centriole is now a daughter centriole in each pair) will remain attached to each other orthogonally until mitosis. At that point the mother and daughter centrioles separate dependently on an enzyme called separase.

The two centrioles in the centrosome are tied to one another. The mother centriole has radiating appendages at the distal end of its long axis and is attached to its daughter at the proximal end. Each daughter cell formed after cell division will inherit one of these pairs. Centrioles start duplicating when DNA replicates.

Origin
The last common ancestor of all eukaryotes was a ciliated cell with centrioles. Some lineages of eukaryotes, such as land plants, do not have centrioles except in their motile male gametes. Centrioles are completely absent from all cells of conifers and flowering plants, which do not have ciliate or flagellate gametes.
It is unclear if the last common ancestor had one or two cilia. Important genes such as centrins required for centriole growth, are only found in eukaryotes, and not in bacteria or archaea.

Etymology and pronunciation
The word centriole uses combining forms of centri- and -ole, yielding "little central part", which describes a centriole's typical location near the center of the cell.

Atypical centrioles
Typical centrioles are made of 9 triplets of microtubules organized with radial symmetry. Centrioles can vary the number of microtubules and can be made of 9 doublets of microtubules (as in Drosophila melanogaster) or 9 singlets of microtubules as in C. elegans. Atypical centrioles are centrioles that do not have microtubules, such as the Proximal Centriole-Like found in D. melanogaster sperm, or that have microtubules with no radial symmetry, such as in the distal centriole of human spermatozoon. Atypical centrioles may have evolved at least eight times independently during vertebrate evolution and may evolve in the sperm after internal fertilization evolves.

It wasn't clear why centriole become atypical until recently. The atypical distal centriole forms a dynamic basal complex (DBC) that, together with other structures in the sperm neck, facilitates a cascade of internal sliding, coupling tail beating with head kinking. The atypical distal centriole's properties suggest that it evolved into a transmission system that couples the sperm tail motors to the whole sperm, thereby enhancing sperm function.

References

Centrosome
Protein complexes
Cell movement